Petilla de Aragón is a town and municipality of the autonomous community of Navarra, northern Spain. The municipality itself is formed by two enclaves (Petilla de Aragón itself and Los Bastanes) that are entirely surrounded by the neighboring autonomous community of Aragón.

In the 15th century, Petilla was the site of a battle between the Navarrese and Aragonese armies in which the fictional troubadour Manrico and the Conte di Luna, of Verdi's Il trovatore, fought on opposite sides, not knowing they were brothers; this is recounted by the gipsy Azucena in her famous aria Stride la vampa!

Notable people
Santiago Ramón y Cajal (1852–1934) was born here; Petilla terminology, a neurological nomenclature, is named after the town.

References

External links
 PETILLA DE ARAGÓN in the Bernardo Estornés Lasa - Auñamendi Encyclopedia (Euskomedia Fundazioa) 

Municipalities in Navarre
Enclaves and exclaves